Mount Pleasant is an unincorporated community in Evans County, in the U.S. state of Georgia.

History
Mount Pleasant took its name from an old church at the town site.

References

Unincorporated communities in Evans County, Georgia